Regina Honu (née Agyare), is a Ghanaian social Entrepreneur, software developer and founder of Soronko Solutions, a software development company in Ghana. She opened Soronko Academy, the first coding and Human-centered design school for children and young adults in West Africa. Honu has received multiple awards, including being named by CNN as one of the 12 inspirational women who rock STEM. She was also named as one of the six women making an impact in Tech in Africa and one of the ten female entrepreneurs to watch in emerging economies.

She has received attention with features on platforms such as CNN African Voices, BBC, Deutsche Welle, Aljazeera as well as the Impatient Optimist blog by The Bill and Melinda Gates Foundation. In an interview with CNN's African Start-Up, she is described as a Ghanaian tech guru who wants to develop the next generation of women in technology.

Honu's story was also published in Sheryl Sandberg's Lean In book. She was named as the 2016 Vlisco Brand Ambassador.

Early life and education 
Regina Honu was born Regina Fremah Agyare. She attended Holy Child High School, Cape Coast for her secondary education.
She is an alumna of Ashesi University and a member of the 2005 class.

Career

Soronko Academy 
Honu founded Soronko foundation in 2012, which brought about Soronko Academy in 2017, to train children and young adults in coding, IT skills, Human-centered design in Ghana, West Africa. The academy was started to help young people especially women and equip them in technical and soft skills necessary to help them in the society and bridge the gender gap in technology. It is the first coding and Human-centered design school for children and young adults in West Africa. By 2021, the program is estimated to have trained over 20,000 women and girls.

Tech Needs Girls 
Honu started the Tech Needs Girls Ghana movement which aims to train and educate more Ghanaian girls into studying technology- related courses. The movement is noted for teaching girls how to code.

She runs Soronko Academy, the first coding and human-centered design school in West Africa, in association with the Tech Needs Girls program which has trained over 3,500 girls in Ghana and Burkina Faso.

Partnership
As part of World Autism Day 2018, Regina Honu partnered with Autism Ambassadors of Ghana for an Autism awareness session. The session helped to create awareness about autism and introduced an Autism Aid App which enable families of children living with Autism to access information from experts on how to take care of these kids.

Personal life
She got married in November 2015 and is now Regina Honu.

Awards and achievements

 Ashoka fellow
 She is an Aspen Institute New Voices Fellow 
 A Mandela Washington Fellow (Young African Leaders Initiative)
 A member of the World Economic Forum community of Global Shapers
 Vital Voices VV lead fellow and part of the 100 exceptional women from the Vital Voices Global Leadership Network
 A GOOD Global Fellow
 She is a change leader with Tigo Reach For Change

 She recently won the 2017 Buffett Award for Emerging Global Leaders from Northwestern University.
She was honoured as one of Coca-Cola 60 Young achievers with an outstanding performance in Technology
 She was then awarded the Big Six award from Coca-Cola Ghana for her incredible contribution in Technology.
  She won the 2016 Startup Entrepreneur of the year and her organization won the Social Enterprise Startup of the Year in the 2016 Ghana StartUp Awards.
 She also won the JCI Ghana Outstanding Young Person award for scientific and technological advancement.
 Her organization was nominated for the editor's choice award in the Women in IT award in the UK
 She was a finalist for the ITU African Digital Woman of the Year.
 She was awarded a Women of Courage Award for Technology
 She is on the project advisory board to help advice the UN Committee for the Rights of a Child update the Convention for the Rights of the Child for a Digital Age
 Tech Needs Girls was awarded in the 2014 Ghana CSR Diary Awards.
 100 Women of the year 2017 by the BBC

See also 

 Timeline of women in computing 
 100 Women (BBC)

References

External links 

 Soronko Academy

 KSM Show- Regina Honu CEO of Soronko Academy and her team hanging out with KSM
 Girls and Women Talking Tech Interview 35 - Regina Honu and Lily Edinam Botsyoe
 How Regina Honu is teaching thousands of girls how to create technology and code

Living people
People from Accra
BBC 100 Women
Social entrepreneurs
Ghanaian computer scientists
Ghanaian women computer scientists
Ghanaian activists
Ashesi University alumni
1980s births
Alumni of Holy Child High School, Ghana
Ashoka Fellows